Fernand Robichaud  (born December 2, 1939) is a Canadian politician.

He was born in Shippagan, New Brunswick and received a teaching certificate from the Moncton Technical Institute. Before entering politics, Robichaud was a teacher and businessman. He served on the municipal council for Saint-Louis-de-Kent from 1971 to 1974.

Robichaud was first elected to the House of Commons of Canada in the 1984 election representing the riding of Westmorland—Kent, New Brunswick.

In the 1988 election, he was re-elected representing Beauséjour.

In 1990, he resigned his seat in order to allow newly elected Liberal leader Jean Chrétien to enter the House of Commons through a by-election.

Robichaud served as Special Assistant to the Leader of the Opposition until returning to the House in the 1993 election. With the election of Chrétien as Prime Minister, Robichaud became Secretary of State for Parliamentary Affairs. In 1994, he was appointed Secretary of State for Agriculture and Agri-Food, Fisheries, and Oceans.

Robichaud did not run in the 1997 election and was appointed on Chrétien's recommendation to the Senate of Canada on September 23, 1997.

From 2001 to 2004, he was deputy government leader in the Senate. He later served as vice-chair of the Senate Standing Committee on Agriculture and Forestry.

On January 29, 2014, Liberal Party leader Justin Trudeau announced all Liberal Senators, including Robichaud, were removed from the Liberal caucus, and would continue sitting as Independents. The Senators referred to themselves as the Senate Liberal Caucus even though they were no longer members of the parliamentary Liberal caucus.

He retired from the Senate on December 2, 2014 upon reaching the mandatory retirement age of 75.

References

External links
 

1939 births
Living people
Liberal Party of Canada senators
Canadian senators from New Brunswick
Members of the 26th Canadian Ministry
Members of the House of Commons of Canada from New Brunswick
Liberal Party of Canada MPs
Acadian people
Members of the King's Privy Council for Canada
New Brunswick municipal councillors